David Cheston Rouzer (born February 16, 1972) is an American politician who is the U.S. representative for North Carolina's 7th congressional district. Previously he was a Republican member of the North Carolina General Assembly, representing Johnston County and Wayne County in the 12th district of the North Carolina Senate.

Early life, education, and business career
Rouzer was born at Landstuhl Army Medical Center in Landstuhl, West Germany, where his father was based, in 1972. He was raised in Durham, North Carolina, where he attended Northern High School.

Rouzer attended North Carolina State University, where he was a member of the Phi Delta Theta Fraternity. In 1994, he earned a Bachelor of Arts degree in agricultural business management, agricultural economics, and chemistry. Rouzer is also a graduate of the Fund for American Studies' Institutes on Business and Government Affairs and American Economic and Political Systems.

Rouzer has been a small business owner of The Rouzer Company and the Warehouse Distribution. From 2001 to 2002, he was assistant to the dean at the North Carolina State University College of Agriculture and Life Sciences. From 2005 to 2006, he was an associate-rural administrator for the U.S. Department of Agriculture.

Early political career

From 1996 to 2001, Rouzer was a legislative aid and Senior Policy Adviser for U.S. Senators Jesse Helms and Elizabeth Dole. In 2000, he ran for North Carolina Commissioner of Agriculture and lost the Republican primary.

North Carolina Senate

Elections
In 2008, incumbent Republican State Senator Fred Smith decided to retire in order to run for governor of North Carolina. Rouzer ran for Smith's old seat and defeated Nena Reeves in the Republican primary, 68%–32%. In the general election, he defeated Kay Carroll, 52%–48%. In 2010, he was reelected with 70% of the vote.

Issues
He worked on strengthening laws allowing youths to obtain driver's licenses. He was also a proponent of the 2012 "sea-level rise" legislation that sought to mandate that only historical data be used to predict future trends.

Rouzer favors repealing the Affordable Care Act. In his 2012 campaign he released a TV ad in which his grandmother promised that he would not cut Medicare if elected. He believes immigrants should be fluent in English before being granted U.S. citizenship. He is pro-life.

Tenure
In his four years, he has sponsored 17 bills that have become signed into law.

Committee assignments
Standing/Select Committees
 Agriculture/Environment/Natural Resources (Co-chairman)
 Appropriations on Natural and Economic Resources (Co-chairman)
 Finance 
 Health Care 
 Insurance 
 Judiciary I 
 Program Evaluation 
 Select Committee on UNC Board of Governors

Non-Standing Committees
 Agriculture and Forestry Awareness Study Commission (Chairman)
 Consolidated Environmental Commission Committee
 Joint Legislative Task Force on Diabetes Prevention and Awareness
 Environmental Review Commission (Chairman)
 Joint Legislative Oversight Committee on Information Technology
 Joint Regulatory Reform Committee (Chairman)
 Revenue Laws Study Committee 
 Joint Select Committee on Tornado Damage Response 

Rouzer is a member of the Republican Study Committee.

U.S. House of Representatives

Elections

2012 

After Republican-controlled redistricting, Rouzer gave up his State Senate seat to run in the newly redrawn North Carolina's 7th congressional district and challenge incumbent Democratic U.S. Representative Mike McIntyre. His home in Johnston County had been drawn into the district; it had previously been in the 2nd District. In the Republican primary, Rouzer defeated both 2010 nominee Ilario Pantano and Randy Crow, but won just four of the district's twelve counties: Johnston (82%), Sampson (49%), Lenoir (43%), and Hoke (38%). His margin in Johnston County, the second-largest in the reconfigured district, was enough for him to win.

The redrawn 7th is much more conservative and Republican than its predecessor. Roll Call rates the election as leans Republican.

After an official tabulation showed that Rouzer had lost the election to McIntyre by 655 votes, Rouzer asked for a recount on November 21, 2012. After the recount, Rouzer conceded the race to McIntyre on November 28. It was the closest House race in the country. Mitt Romney carried the district with 56% of the vote.

2014 

Rouzer ran for the 7th district again in 2014. McIntyre retired rather than face a rematch. Most pundits believed that with McIntyre's retirement, the seat would be an easy GOP pickup. Even before his near miss in 2012, the 7th had been trending Republican for some time.

Rouzer won the general election with almost 60% of the vote. Upon taking office in January 2015, he became only the second Republican to represent a significant portion of eastern North Carolina in the House since Reconstruction.

2016 

After court-ordered redistricting, Rouzer's district was made slightly more compact. It lost most of its share of Johnston County and was pushed slightly to the east, picking up all of Wilmington–long the district's largest city–as well as Goldsboro. Rouzer was unopposed for the Republican nomination and defeated Democrat J. Wesley Casteen in the general election with 60.9% of the vote.

2018 

Rouzer won a third term to Congress with 55.5% of the vote over Democratic nominee Kyle Horton and Constitution Party nominee David Fallin, his narrowest margin of victory so far. Before the election, he sold his home in Benson and bought one in Wilmington, saying it was "a reflection of where I spend the vast majority of my time."

2020 

Rouzer defeated Democratic nominee Christopher Ward with about 60% of the vote.

Tenure
Rouzer was sworn into office on January 3, 2015, for the 114th Congress. As of May 2019, he had sponsored 24 pieces of legislation during his tenure, of which 2 became public law. He also coauthored (with U.S. Senator Thom Tillis) a provision to the John D. Dingell Jr. Conservation, Management, and Recreation Act that gave authority to the United States Secretary of the Interior to designate a World War II Heritage city each year. The provision went into effect when the legislation was signed into law by President Donald Trump in 2019. Wilmington was expected to be among the first designated Heritage Cities.

In 2015, Rouzer cosponsored an amendment to amend the US constitution to ban same-sex marriage.

In December 2020, Rouzer was one of 126 Republican members of the House of Representatives to sign an amicus brief in support of Texas v. Pennsylvania, a lawsuit filed at the United States Supreme Court contesting the results of the 2020 presidential election, in which Joe Biden defeated Trump. The Supreme Court declined to hear the case on the basis that Texas lacked standing under Article III of the Constitution to challenge the results of an election held by another state.

Committee assignments

Committee on Transport and Infrastructure
Subcommittee on Water Resources and Environment (Chair)
Subcommittee on Highways and Transit
Subcommittee on Aviation
Committee on Agriculture
Subcommittee on Livestock and Foreign Agriculture (Vice-chair)
Subcommittee on Commodity Exchanges, Energy, and Credit

Caucus memberships 

 Republican Study Committee

Texas vs. Pennsylvania

After the 2020 presidential election, Rouzer was among 126 House Republicans who supported Texas v. Pennsylvania, a December 2020 lawsuit that asked the Supreme Court to overturn Biden's electoral victories in Georgia, Michigan, Pennsylvania and Wisconsin. North Carolina Attorney General Josh Stein joined other State Attorneys General in opposing Texas's suit, saying "This suit seeks to overturn the will of the people by throwing out the votes of tens of millions of Americans." The Supreme Court denied Texas's motion for lack of standing under Article III of the Constitution. On January 6, 2021, Rouzer was one of 147 Republican lawmakers who objected to the certification of electoral votes from the 2020 presidential election just hours after a mob of Trump supporters stormed the U.S. Capitol forcing an emergency recess of Congress.

References

External links

 Congressman David Rouzer official U.S. House website
 David Rouzer for Congress
 
 
 

|-

|-

1972 births
21st-century American politicians
Living people
Republican Party North Carolina state senators
North Carolina State University alumni
People from Durham, North Carolina
People from Johnston County, North Carolina
Republican Party members of the United States House of Representatives from North Carolina
Candidates in the 2012 United States elections
United States congressional aides